Eric Williams (1911–1981) was the Prime Minister of Trinidad and Tobago.

Eric or Erik Williams may also refer to:

Arts and entertainment
Eric Williams (writer) (1911–1983), English author; former inmate of Stalag Luft III and writer of The Wooden Horse
Eric Williams (singer) (born 1960), member of the R&B group Blackstreet
Eric Bransby Williams (1900–1994), British actor
Eric C. Williams (1918–2010), British science fiction author 
Eric Lloyd Williams (1915–1988), South African-born journalist and war correspondent
Eric Kostiuk Williams (born 1990), cartoonist and illustrator
Eric R. Williams, professor and new media storyteller
Grim Reaper (comics), the Marvel Comics supervillain, whose real name is Eric Williams

Sports

American football
Erik Williams (born 1968), American offensive tackle
Eric Williams (defensive lineman) (born 1962), American defensive tackle
Eric Williams (linebacker) (born 1955), American
Eric Williams (safety) (born 1960), American

Other sports
Eric Williams (basketball, born 1972), American former basketball player in the National Basketball Association
Eric Williams (basketball, born 1984), American-Bulgarian basketball player
Eric Williams (footballer) (born 1921), British footballer
Eric Williams (football coach), English football manager
Eric Williams (motorcyclist) (1893–1963), British pioneer of motor cycle racing
Eric Williams (swimmer) (born 1977), Nigerian
Eric Williams (speedway rider) (1927-2009), Welsh speedway rider

Others
Eric Williams, former Justice of the Peace, convicted in the 2013 Kaufman County murders case in Texas
Eric A. Williams, contemporary Trinidad and Tobago politician

See also
Eric Williamson (disambiguation)